Colin Tuaa is a football player turned manager who represented New Zealand as a player.

Career
Tuaa's club career involved 275 New Zealand National League appearances and 83 goals.

Tuaa made 10 A-International appearances for New Zealand between 1983 and 1988, scoring 1 goal.

In 2007 Tuaa took charge of the New Zealand U-17 team at the FIFA U-17 World Cup in Korea.

In addition to his role as U-17 coach, Tuaa is head coach at Auckland City FC, having previously coached Nelson Suburbs and Youngheart Manawatu.

References

External links 

Living people
Papatoetoe AFC players
Miramar Rangers AFC players
New Zealand association footballers
New Zealand international footballers
Association footballers not categorized by position
Year of birth missing (living people)